Hubert Clément (12 September 1889 – 29 September 1953) was a Luxembourgish journalist and politician.  He served as the Mayor of Esch-sur-Alzette, as a member of the Council of State, as a member of the Chamber of Deputies.  He was a director of the Tageblatt newspaper, based in Esch-sur-Alzette.

He gives his name to the Lycée Hubert Clément, a school in Esch-sur-Alzette, the construction of which was made possible by the city's purchase of the land in 1938, under Clément's mayoralty.

Footnotes

Mayors of Esch-sur-Alzette
Members of the Chamber of Deputies (Luxembourg)
Members of the Council of State of Luxembourg
Councillors in Esch-sur-Alzette
Luxembourg Socialist Workers' Party politicians
Luxembourgian journalists
Male journalists
Tageblatt people
1889 births
1953 deaths
20th-century journalists